was a Japanese professional baseball pitcher. He played in Nippon Professional Baseball (NPB) for the Toei Flyers/Nittaku Home Flyers/Nippon Ham Fighters and the Hiroshima Toyo Carp.

References

External links

1947 births
2022 deaths
People from Hamamatsu
Japanese baseball players
Nippon Professional Baseball pitchers
Toei Flyers players
Nippon Ham Fighters players
Hiroshima Toyo Carp players
Nippon Professional Baseball Rookie of the Year Award winners